Carter Wong (born Wong Chia-ta on March 22, 1947) is a Chinese actor and martial artist, who is mainly known for roles in Kung Fu action movies. The biggest movies he was featured in are Big Trouble in Little China (1986), and Yong zheng ming zhang Shao Lin men (1977). As an actor, he contributed to more than seventy martial arts films. He also worked as a stuntman in films, and was the fighting instructor for the movie Rambo III. Wong is still active in martial arts.

Acting 
Wong’s first substantial movie role was in 1972, for the movie He qi dao, in which he played Kao Chang.  Using several pseudonyms, Wong appeared in multiple martial arts movies for many years. The majority of his movies are shot in Hong Kong and Taiwan and spoken in his mother tongue Mandarin. With the growing popularity of Chinese kung fu films in the rest of the world, a great number of movies Wong played in were overdubbed in English, among which is the 1978 kung fu Hall Of Fame Classic Tai ji yuan gong (translated as Born Invincible), in which he plays a shaolin fighter that is trained so heavily from childhood on, that he is now impervious to weapons. With the film Yong zheng ming zhang Shao Lin men (1982. translated and released Shaolin Invincibles) he drew attention from Hollywood and he was invited to make movies there too.

Director 
Besides roles in front of the camera, Wong has directed fighting scenes for a number of movies.

Other 
Wong was a martial arts instructor for the Royal Hong Kong Police Department.

Filmography 
 Hap Ki Do (1972) ... Kao Chung  
 Deadly China Doll (1973) ... Pai Chien  
 When Taekwondo Strikes (1973) ... Jin Zhengzhi  
 Bruce Lee, the Man and the Legend (1973) ... [Himself]  
 Back Alley Princess (1973) ... Chiang's eldest student  
 The Tournament (1974) ... Lau Siu-fung's brother  
 The Skyhawk (1974) ... Leo  
 Naughty! Naughty! (1974) ... Boss Feng's thug  
 Kung Fu on the Bosporus (1974) ... Captain Wong (new edit)  
 18 Shaolin Disciples (1975)      
 The Seven Coffins (1975)      
 The Association (1975) ... policeman  
 Hong Kong Superman (1975)      
 The Dragon Tamers (1975) ... Fang  
 Dragon Gate (1975) ... Chang Mao  
 All in the Family (1975) ... Policeman  
 Marco Polo (1975) ... Zu Jianmin  
 Mutiny on the High Sea (1975)      
 Heroes in the Late Ming Dynasty (1975) ... Emperor  
 Eight Hundred Heroes (1975) ... Mr Wang  
 18 Bronzemen (1976) ... Brother Wan  
 Shaolin Kung Fu Mystagogue (1976) ... Fang Shao-ching  
 The Good, the Bad and the Loser (1976) ... The Bad  
 The Ming Patriots (1976)      
 The Story of the Dragon (1976) ... Mr Liu  
 Shaolin Traitorous (1976) ... Shang Yung  
 Return of the 18 Bronzemen (1976) ... Yong Zhen  
 The Blazing Temple (1976)      
 The Best of Shaolin Kung Fu (1976)      
 The Last Battle of Yang Chao (1976) ... Chu Chin-yeung  
 The Invisible Terrorist (1976)      
 The Shaolin Invincibles (1977) ... Kan Feng-chih  
 Princess and the Toxicant (1977)      
 The Fatal Flying Guillotines (1977) ... Shen Ping  
 Shaolin Death Squads (1977)      
 The Shaolin Kids (1977) ... Shang Kuan-tung  
 The Eight Masters (1977) ... Chu Shiao-chieh  
 Chivalrous Inn (1977)      
 Killer from Above (1977) ... Hsueh Ko-shu  
 Heroes of the Eastern Skies (1977) ... Japanese pilot  
 The Shaolin Brothers (1977) ... General Ko Lung-ta  
 The Mysterious Heroes (1977) ... Chu Tien-lung  
 Shaolin Iron Finger (1977)      
 The Rebel of Shao-Lin (1977) ... Lei Pang-fei  
 Super Kung Fu Fighter (1978)      
 Snaky Knight Fight Against Mantis (1978) ... Chan Sing-kwan  
 Raging Tiger Vs. Monkey King (1978)      
 Funny Kung Fu (1978) ... Hsu Shi-chun   
 Filthy Guy (1978)      
 Born Invincible (1978) ... Tieh Wu-ching  
 Way of the Black Dragon (1978)      
 Killer of Snake, Fox of Shaolin (1978) ... wandering hero  
 Magnificent Fist (1978)      
 The Legendary Strike (1978) ... Lord Yun   
 The Magnificent (1979)      
 Rage of the Dragon (1980) ... Master Kwan  
 Mr. Kwong Tung and the Robber (1980)      
 The Luckiest Trio (1980) ... Superintendent Wong  
 The Furious Killer (1981)      
 Gold Constables (1981)      
 The Cold Blooded Murder (1981)      
 Emperor of Shaolin Kung Fu (1981) ... Tu, the butcher  
 Interpol (1982)      
 Blow Up (1982) ... Red Skivvy  
 Big Trouble in Little China (1986) ... Thunder
 Hardcase And Fist (1988) ... Eddy Lee
 Kickboxer the Champion (1990) ... [THE MAGNIFICENT footage]  
 The Transmigration Romance (1991) ... Mo Tsai   
 The Way of the Lady Boxers (1992) ... Captain Chiu Chie
 Sex For Sale (1993) ... Huang   
 Hope (1995) ... office clerk in Canada  
 Asian Cop: High Voltage (1995) ... Police Officer  
 Naked Angel (1996)
 Tiger Claws III: The Final Conflict (2000) ... Master Jin 
 One Arm Hero (2005) ... Wong Ho     
 Hero the Great (2005)
 The Stop Hit (2016) ... Chief Chan Sing
 Monk Into the City (2017) ... Shaolin Dashi 
 Gung Fu, JKD & MMA (2019)

As fight director 
 Raging Tiger Vs. Monkey King (1978)      
 Magnificent Fist (1978)      
 Sex For Sale (1993)

References

External links
 
 

1947 births
Living people
Chinese male film actors
Hong Kong male film actors
Hong Kong male television actors
Hong Kong kung fu practitioners